The Board of Regents of the University of the State of New York is responsible for the general supervision of all educational activities within New York State, presiding over University of the State of New York and the New York State Education Department.

History
The board was established by statute on May 1, 1784. The members were divided into five classes: 1) ex officio members including the Governor of New York, the Lieutenant Governor of New York, the Secretary of State of New York, the New York Attorney General, and the Speaker of the New York State Assembly, the Mayor of New York City, the Mayor of Albany, New York, 2) two people from each of the then twelve existing counties, 3) one representative of each religious denomination in the state, chosen by their congregation, 4) founders of any college or school in the state (and their heirs or successors), and 5) representatives from selected colleges.

The regents were spread across the state and getting a necessary quorum proved difficult given the size of the state and travel demands. On November 26, 1784, 33 additional members were appointed, twenty of them from New York City and affiliated with King's College (now known as Columbia University). This arrangement also proved ineffective, so on April 13, 1787, the Legislature legislated the existing regents out of office, and a new set of regents was appointed: the Governor and the Lieutenant Governor continued as ex officio members, and 19 regents were appointed for life.  This legislation also shifted the regents' focus from Columbia to schools, colleges, and universities across the state. On April 8, 1842, the Secretary of State was added again as an ex officio member, and on March 30, 1854, the Superintendent of Public Instruction. Vacancies were filled by joint ballot of the state legislature.

The regents were made a constitutional body, no longer defined by statute, in 1894. In 1904, the board was reorganized again and the ex officio members were legislated out. The offices of superintendent of public instruction and secretary of the board of regents were abolished and the duties of both transferred to the commissioner of education, who "serves at the pleasure" of the board of regents. The regents continued to be elected by joint ballot of the legislature. Eleven of the sitting 19 regents were chosen by the legislature to continue in office, and were classified to serve for different term lengths, so that every year one seat came up for election, for a full term. The number of board members was reduced to eight, one regent per New York State Judicial District (based on the 1876 Act establishing the districts.), plus three "at large" members. 
 New York (Manhattan) and Bronx (Bronx) Counties
 Kings (Brooklyn), Nassau, Queens, Richmond (Staten Island), Suffolk (Long Island), Dutchess, Orange, Putnam, Rockland, Westchester (Yonkers) Counties (Hudson Valley)
 Albany (Albany), Columbia, Greene, Rensselaer, Schoharie, Sullivan, Ulster Counties (Capital District)
 Clinton, Essex, Franklin, Fulton, Hamilton, Montgomery, St. Lawrence, Saratoga, Schenectady, Warren, Washington Counties (North Country)
 Herkimer, Jefferson, Lewis, Oneida, Onondaga (Syracuse), Oswego Counties (Central Region)
 Broome (Binghamton), Chemung, Chenango, Cortland, Delaware, Madison, Otsego, Schuyler, Tioga, Tompkins Counties (Southern Tier)
 Cayuga, Livingston, Monroe (Rochester), Ontario, Seneca, Steuben, Wayne, Yates Counties (Finger Lakes)
 Allegany, Cattaraugus, Chautauqua, Erie (Buffalo), Genesee, Niagara, Orleans, Wyoming Counties (Western Region)
New Regents members have been sworn in as Districts were added and reconfigured. 
 1909: Francis M. Carpenter sworn in as the first Regent from District 9 (Dutchess, Orange, Putnam, Rockland, and Westchester Counties)  
 1948: Cornelius W. Wickersham sworn in as the first Regent from District 10 (Suffolk County) 
 1963: Joseph T. King sworn in as the first Regent from District 11 (Queens)  
 1965: Max J. Rubin sworn in as the first 4th At Large member 
 1983: Jorge L. Batista sworn in as the first Regent from District 12 (Bronx) and Norma Gluck was sworn in as the new District 1 Regent  
 2009: Christine D. Cea sworn in as the first Regent from District 13 (Staten Island) 
Section 202 of the education laws of 1945 established that a regent could not serve past April 1 in the year following their 70th birthday or be a "trustee, president, principal, or any other officer of an institution belonged to the university." If either event occurred, the Regent was expected to resign from the board. This restriction was lifted in 1986 with the passage of a New York State law banning mandatory retirement ages in most sectors.

Currently, 17 members serve, representing each of the 13 judicial districts plus 4 at-large members. Regents currently serve for a term of five years. The Regents have never received a salary and only their travel expenses are reimbursed.

List of Regents

Ex officio members who served from May 1, 1784 founding to April 13, 1787 reconfiguration
 George Clinton, Governor
 Pierre Van Cortlandt, Lieutenant Governor
 James Duane, Mayor of New York City
 Johannes Jacobse Beeckman, Mayor of Albany, until September 29, 1786
 Egbert Benson, Attorney General
 John Morin Scott, Secretary of State, until September 14, 1784
 Lewis Allaire Scott, Secretary of State, from October 23, 1784
 John Hathorn, Speaker, until October 12, 1784
 David Gelston, Speaker, October 12, 1784, to January 12, 1786
 John Lansing, Jr., Speaker, January 12, 1786 to January 12, 1787; Mayor of Albany, January 12, 1787
 Richard Varick, Speaker, January 12, 1787
 Abraham Yates, President Pro Tempore of the NYS Senate, from October 18

Regents appointed on May 1, 1784 who served until the April 13, 1787 reconfiguration

 Henry Brockholst Livingston
 Robert Harpur
 Walter Livingston
 Christopher Yates
 Anthony Hoffman
 Cornelius Humfrey
 Lewis Morris
 Philip Pell
 Henry Wisner
 John Haring
 Christopher Tappen
 James Clinton
 Christopher P. Yates
 James Livingston
 Abraham Bancker
 John C. Dongan
 Matthew Clarkson
 Rutger Van Brunt
 James Townsend
 Thomas Lawrence
 Ezra L'Hommedieu
 Caleb Smith
 John Williams
 John McCrea

Regents added on November 12, 1784 who served until the April 13, 1787 reconfiguration

 John Jay
 Samuel Provost
 John Henry Livingston
 Rev. John Rodgers
 John Mason
 John Gano
 John Daniel Gros
 Johan Ch. Kunze
 Joseph Delaplain
 Gershom Seixas
 Alexander Hamilton
 John Laurance
 John Rutherford
 Morgan Lewis
 Leonard Lispenard
 John Cochran
 Charles McKnight
 Thomas Jones
 Malachi Trent
 Nicholas Romain
 Peter W. Yates
 Matthew Vischer
 Hunlock Woodruff
 George J. L. Doll
 John Vanderbilt
 Thomas Romain
 Samuel Buel
 Gilbert Livingston
 Nathan Kerr
 Ebenezer Lockwood
 John Lloyd, Jr.
 Hermanus Garrison
 Ebenezer Russell

Regents Sworn In from April 13, 1787 to 1904 reconfiguration

Notes: Ex officio tenures are not mentioned if the officeholder was a full member at the same time.

Regents Sworn in Since the April 1, 1904 reconfiguration

Chancellors
 George Clinton, 1784-1785, 1787–1795
 John Jay, 1796–1801
 George Clinton, 1801–1804
 Morgan Lewis, 1805–1807
 Daniel D. Tompkins, 1808–1817
 John Tayler, 1817–1829
 Simeon De Witt, 1829–1834
 Stephen Van Rensselaer, 1835–1839
 James King, 1839–1841
 Peter Wendell, 1842–1849
 Gerrit Y. Lansing, 1849–1862
 John V. L. Pruyn, 1862–1877
 Erastus C. Benedict, 1878–1880
 Henry R. Pierson, 1881–1890
 George William Curtis, 1890–1892
 Anson Judd Upson, 1892–1902
 William Croswell Doane, 1902–1904
 Whitelaw Reid, 1904–1912
 St. Clair McKelway, 1913–1915
 Pliny T. Sexton, 1915–1921
 Albert Vander Veer, 1921
 Chester S. Lord, 1921–1933
 James Byrne, 1933–1937
 Thomas J. Mangan, 1937–1945
 William John Wallin, 1945–1950
 John Platt Myers, 1951–1957
 Roger Straus, 1957
 John F. Brosnan, 1957-1961
 Edgar W. Couper, 1961–1968
 Joseph W. McGovern, 1968–1975
 Theodore M. Black, 1975–1980
 Willard A. Genrich, 1980–1985
 Martin C. Barell, 1985–1992
 R. Carlos Carballada, 1991–1995
 Carl T. Hayden, 1995–2002
 Robert M. Bennett, 2002–2009
 Merryl Tisch, 2009–2016 (first female chancellor)
 Betty A. Rosa 2016–2020 (first Latina/Hispanic chancellor)
 T. Andrew Brown 2020–2021
Lester W. Young, Jr. 2021-2022

References

 Minutes of the Regents of the University (1860; pg. iii–ix)
 New York Civil List (1867; pg. 416–419)
 New York Red Book (1897; pg. 646)
 New York Red Book (1902; pg. 497)
 "Dr. Draper Will Accept" in The New York Times on March 8, 1904

1784 establishments in New York (state)
State University of New York
Education in New York (state)